is a passenger railway station located in the city of Tsuyama, Okayama Prefecture, Japan, operated by West Japan Railway Company (JR West).

Lines

Station layout
The station consists of one ground-level side platform serving a single  bi-directional track. The station originally had a second side platform,  connected to the wooden station building by a level crossing, but it is no longer in use and the track has been removed. The station is unattended.

Adjacent stations

History
Mimasaka-Sendai Station opened on August 21, 1923. With the privatization of the Japan National Railways (JNR) on April 1, 1987, the station came under the aegis of the West Japan Railway Company.

Passenger statistics
In fiscal 2019, the station was used by an average of 37 passengers daily..

Surrounding area
Tsuyama City Hall Kume Branch
Tsuyama Municipal Kume Junior High School
Chugoku Expressway Kume Bus Stop
 Japan National Route 181

See also
List of railway stations in Japan

References

External links

  Mimasaka-Sendai Station Official Site

Railway stations in Okayama Prefecture
Kishin Line
Railway stations in Japan opened in 1923
Tsuyama